George William may refer to:

George William, Elector of Brandenburg (1595–1640)
George William, Duke of Brunswick-Lüneburg (1624–1705)
Prince George William of Hesse-Darmstadt (1722–1782)
George William, Prince of Schaumburg-Lippe (1784–1860)
George William, Duke of Liegnitz (1660–1675)
George William, Count Palatine of Zweibrücken-Birkenfeld (1598–1669)
Prince George William of Great Britain (1717–1718)
George William, Margrave of Brandenburg-Bayreuth (1678–1726)
Prince George William of Hanover (disambiguation), two people

See also
George (disambiguation)
William (disambiguation)
William George (disambiguation)